The 2010 DFL-Supercup marked the return of the German Supercup, an annual football match contested by the winners of the previous season's Bundesliga and DFB-Pokal competitions. The competition had not been played in an official capacity since 1996, and was replaced by the DFB Liga-Pokal from 1997 to 2007. For the previous two years, an unofficial super cup had been contested.

The match was played at the Impuls Arena in Augsburg on 7 August 2010, and was contested by 2009–10 Bundesliga and 2009–10 DFB-Pokal double winners Bayern Munich, and league runners-up Schalke 04. Bayern won 2–0 with goals from Thomas Müller and Miroslav Klose.

Teams

Match

Details

References

2010
2010–11 in German football cups
FC Bayern Munich matches
FC Schalke 04 matches
21st century in Augsburg